Arvind Venugopal (born 28 September 1991) is an Indian playback singer who predominantly works in the Malayalam film industry. He started his singing career in the year 2011 with the song "Chirakingu Vanamingu" from the film The Train composed by popular singer/composer Srinivas. He has since sung in various Malayalam films including Natholi Oru Cheriya Meenalla, Angels , Sunday Holiday, Luca ,Hridayam and others. He has worked with many critically acclaimed films, including Koode as an assistant director to acclaimed director Anjali Menon.

Personal life
Arvind Venugopal was born in Thiruvananthapuram, Kerala. He is the son of famous Malayalam singer, G. Venugopal and Reshmi Venugopal. Popular singers Sujatha  and Shweta Mohan are his aunt and cousin respectively.

Education
Arvind is an alumnus of St. Thomas Central School (Trivandrum). He did his Bachelors at Madras Christian College (Chennai) & went on to pursue a Masters degree at Christ University (Bangalore) & New York Film Academy.

Career

Arvind started singing during his college days in Chennai and was a regular sight at inter-collegiate cultural fests where he would participate along with his band. He was first called to sing in the 2011 movie The Train by the film's composer Srinivas . He sang the song "Chirakingu Vanamingu" along with Sharanya Srinivas. His next song was "Kannadi Chillil Minnum" for the 2012 movie Natholi Oru Cheriya Meenalla. His other works include "Irul Mazhayil" from the movie Angels , "Nee Akaleyano" from My Life Partner, "Mazha Paadum" from Sunday Holiday (for which he received the best duet of the year award along with his co-singer/actor Aparna Balamurali presented by Manorama Music Awards 2018 & Red FM Music Awards 2018) ,"Vanil Chandrika" from the 2019 film Luca,"Nagumo" and "Nagumo Revival" from the 2022 film Hridayam and then sang three song in Kannada for the film Monsoon Raaga. 
Apart from playback singing, Arvind is known for his cover versions of popular Malayalam & Tamil songs that he has performed for the show 'Music Mojo' aired on Kappa TV.

Discography & Filmography

Discography

Filmography

Awards and nominations

References

Malayalam playback singers
1991 births
Living people